The Japanese group Lead has released over forty music videos since their debut in 2002. They debuted as a hip-hop group with the music video "Manatsu no Magic" on July 31, 2002. In other visual media, the group has been a part of several films and television shows. In 2003, all four members (Hiroki Nakadoi, Shinya Tanuichi, Keita Furuya, Akira Kagimoto) appeared in the film Boutaoshi!, with Shinya taking on the lead role of Tsuguo Takayama. All four members also appeared in the 2004 film Kamachi. Along with performing the theme song "Get Wild Life", Shinya took on the role of the title character and Hiroki was featured as the troubled teen Shun Iijima. In 2014, Shinya took the role of Tsuyoshi Kakinoki for the movie Oretachi no Ashita.

The release of Lead's debut album Life On Da Beat (2003) was preceded by the music videos for its singles "Manatsu no Magic", "Show me the way" and "Fly Away". Due to the success of both "Manatsu no Magic" and "Show me the way", Lead was able to secure the spot for the Best Newcomer Award during the 44th Japan Record Awards.

List of music videos

2000s

2010s
{| class="wikitable sortable plainrowheaders" style="text-align:center;"
|-
! scope="col" style="width:25em;"| Title
! scope="col" style="width:2em;"| Year
! scope="col" style="width:10em;"| Director(s)
! scope="col" style="width:2em;" class="unsortable" | 
|-
!scope="row"|"Speed Star"
|2010
|
|
|-
!scope="row"|"Hurricane"
|2011
|
|
|-
!scope="row"|"Wanna Be With You"
|2012
|
|
|-
!scope="row"|"Stand and Fight"
|2012
|
|
|-
!scope="row"|"Still"
|2012
|
|
|-
!scope="row"|"Upturn"
|2013
|
|
|-
!scope="row"|"Upturn" -Dance Focused ver.-
|2015
|
|
|-
!scope="row"|"Green Days"
|2013
|
|
|-
!scope="row"|"Sakura"
|2014
|
|
|-
!scope="row"|"Sakura" -Dance Ver.-
|2014
|
|
|-
!scope="row"|"Omoide Breaker"
|2014
|
|
|-
!scope="row"|"Omoide Breaker" -Dance Ver.-
|2014
|
|
|-
!scope="row"|"My One"
|2015
|
|
|-
!scope="row"|"Green Days" -Shinya Tanuichi Solo Focused ver.-
|2015
|
|
|-
!scope="row"|"Green Days" -Keita Furuya Solo Focused ver.-
|2015
|
|
|-
!scope="row"|"Green Days" -Akira Kagimoto Solo Focused ver.-
|2015
|
|
|-
!scope="row"|"My One" -Dance Ver.-
|2015
|
|
|-
!scope="row"|"Yakusoku"
|2015
|Seiji Kitahara
|
|-
!scope="row"|"Yakusoku" -Dance Ver.-
|2015
|Seiji Kitahara
|
|-
!scope="row"|"Zoom Up"
|2016
|Seiji Kitahara
|
|-
!scope="row"|"Zoom Up" -Dance Ver.-
|2016
|Seiji Kitahara
|
|-
!scope="row"|"Tokyo Fever"
|2017
|Jun Nakao
|
|-
!scope="row"|"Tokyo Fever" -Dance Ver.-
|2017
|Jun Nakao
|
|-
!scope="row"|"Beautiful Day"
|2017
|Yoshiharu Seri
|
|-
!scope="row"|"Shampoo Bubble" -Image Movie in Hawaii-|2017
|Seijiro Tashiro
|
|-
!scope="row"|"Bumblebee"
|2018
|Hideaki Sunaga
|
|-
!scope="row"|"Love or Love?"
|2018
|Tatsuya Murakami
|
|-
!scope="row"|"Backpack" -Choreo Ver.-|2018
|
|
|-
!scope="row"|"Be the Naked"
|2019
|
|
|-
!scope="row"|"Summer Vacation"
|2019
|
|
|}

2020s

Albums
Live video albums

Music video albums

Filmography

Limited video release
Lead DramaboxLead Dramabox (stylized as Lead dramabox) is a collection of Japanese television dramas that featured one or more members of Lead. It was of limited release during the month of February 2011 and contained thirteen shows spanning across a three disc set. The collection was only released on Vision Factory's online shop. 

InformationLead dramabox is a special DVD collection released by Vision Factory with dramas featuring one or more members of the Japanese hip-hop group Lead (Hiroki Nakadoi, Shinya Tanuichi, Keita Furuya, Akira Kagimoto). It was of limited release and buyers could only purchase it through Vision Factory's online shop.

Spanning across three discs, the collection held thirteen dramas released through Open Cast and Vision Factory. Disc one held the dramas Syakkin Kanojo, Syakkin Kanojo 2 1000 Rhapsody, Shitamachi Detective Story -Find Maria!- and Shitamachi Detective Story 2.

Disc two featured the dramas Flowers ~Junketsu no Yuri~, Senko Hanabi, Kanojo to Boku to Toshokan de, Kokuhaku Sunzentsu!, Oretachi no Relation and Yakusoku no Cafe. Disc three held the three dramas Natsu wa Owaranai, Last Love and Game''.

Track listing

References

External links
Lead Official Site

Videographies of Japanese artists